HIP 70849 b is an extrasolar planet which orbits the K-type main sequence star HIP 70849, located approximately 79 light years away in the constellation Lupus. This planet was detected by HARPS and announced on October 19, 2009, together with 31 other planets. This was significantly updated in a December 2022 paper, which found much better constrained parameters including a high eccentricity, and in a January 2023 paper which determined the planet's inclination and true mass via astrometry.

References 

Exoplanets discovered in 2009
Exoplanets detected by radial velocity
Exoplanets detected by astrometry
Giant planets
Lupus (constellation)